The 2016 Outback Bowl was an American college football bowl game that was played on January 1, 2016, at Raymond James Stadium in Tampa, Florida. It was the 30th edition of the Outback Bowl (previously called the Hall of Fame Bowl), featuring the #13 Northwestern Wildcats from the Big Ten and the #23 Tennessee Volunteers from the SEC. It was one of the 2015–16 bowl games that concluded the 2015 FBS football season, with kickoff at noon EST on ESPN2. It was sponsored by the Outback Steakhouse restaurant franchise.

Teams

Northwestern
Northwestern, ranked #13 in the nation, finished the regular season with a 10–2 record, losing two consecutive games mid-season to ranked teams, Michigan and Iowa. The Wildcats finished second in the Big Ten's western division behind Iowa. Northwestern was led by quarterback Clayton Thorson, with support from runningback Justin Jackson. Pat Fitzgerald was in his tenth year as Northwestern's head coach.

Tennessee
After starting the season ranked as high as #23 in the country, Tennessee went 3–4, losing two of three close games to higher-ranked teams and having fourth-quarter leads in all four losses, before winning their last five games of the season. The Volunteers won against then-ranked #19 Georgia and lost only one game in the remainder of the SEC schedule, which was to eventual National Champion Alabama. Tennessee is led by quarterback Joshua Dobbs, with support from running backs Jalen Hurd and Alvin Kamara, as well as Evan Berry and Cameron Sutton on special teams. The Volunteers are coached by Butch Jones in his third year.

Series history
In their only series game, the 1997 Florida Citrus Bowl, Tennessee won 48–28.

Game summary

Scoring summary

Source:

Statistics

References

External links
 

2015–16 NCAA football bowl games
2016
2016 Outback Bowl
2016 Outback Bowl
January 2016 sports events in the United States
2016 in sports in Florida
21st century in Tampa, Florida